Renee Ginsberg Rabinowitz (1934 – May 19, 2020) was an American-Israeli psychologist and lawyer. She was born to an Orthodox Jewish family in Belgium, but fled with her family to the United States in 1941, following the outbreak of World War II, and grew up in New York City. She earned a doctorate in educational psychology at the University of Chicago, and a law degree at Notre Dame University. She taught psychology at Indiana University, and later served as in-house legal counsel at Colorado College. In 2016, Rabinowitz was included in the BBC 100 Women list of most influential women. In 2017, she successfully sued El Al, after the airline forced her to move her seat on a Newark–Tel Aviv flight at the request of a Haredi Jewish man who refused to sit beside her due to his religious beliefs.

Early life and education 
Rabinowitz was born in Belgium in 1934. Her family fled The Holocaust in 1941 to the United States. She grew up in New York City, before leaving the city to attend the University of Chicago, where she earned masters and doctoral degrees in educational psychology. Her 1969 Master's thesis was titled, The perceived locus of control of reinforcements among sixth-grade Negro children. Her 1974 dissertation was titled, Personal Causation, Role-Taking, and Effectiveness with Peers: A Study of Social Competence in Elementary School Children.

She also earned a law degree from Notre Dame Law School.

Career 
Rabinowitz taught psychology at Indiana University. She later served as in-house legal counsel at Colorado College, and as a professional volunteer at the Israel Center for the Treatment of Psychotrauma.

El Al discrimination lawsuit
In December 2015, Rabinowitz was flying business class on an El Al flight from Newark, New Jersey, to Tel Aviv, Israel. After being seated next to a Haredi Jewish man, the man complained to an onboard flight attendant that he did not want to sit next to a woman because of his religious beliefs. As a result, Rabinowitz was forced to move seats. After speaking to Anat Hoffman, director of the Israel Religious Action Center (IRAC), the organization filed a court case on her behalf for unlawful discrimination. IRAC represented Rabinowitz at the trial.

In June 2017, Rabinowitz was awarded 6,500 shekels (about $1,800). The trial also ruled that El Al's practice of requiring unwilling passengers to accommodate Haredi religious mores violated the country's Prohibition of Discrimination in Products law. The court required El Al to update its policy within six months to comply with Israeli discrimination law. After the verdict, IRAC lawyer Riki Shapira Rosenberg said they expected this to be extended to other airlines.

Related incidents 
In 2018, the Israel Religious Action Center attempted to run an advertising campaign reminding Israeli women that they were not required to change seats at the request of men. The proposed  advertisements were blocked by the authorities. In the same year, NICE Ltd. CEO Barak Eilam criticised El Al after they forced women to move seats at the request of Haredi men. Speaking about the incident, IRAC said that the incident was a violation of Rabinowitz's court decision.

Personal life
Rabinowitz had three children from her first marriage. She was divorced from her first husband in 1986, and married Rabbi Stanley M. Wagner of Denver, Colorado, in November 1990. She gained two stepchildren through her marriage to Wagner. Rabinowitz and Wagner made Aliyah to Israel in 2006, but frequently visited the United States. She lived the final years of her life in an assisted-living facility in Jerusalem. Rabinowitz died on May 19, 2020, in Jerusalem.

Awards and honors 
In 2016, Rabinowitz was included in the BBC 100 Women list of most influential women.

Selected works

References

1934 births
2020 deaths
Date of birth missing
Holocaust survivors
Belgian emigrants to the United States
20th-century American lawyers
21st-century American lawyers
Indiana University faculty
21st-century American psychologists
American women psychologists
20th-century American psychologists
20th-century Israeli lawyers
21st-century Israeli lawyers
Colorado College faculty
Notre Dame Law School alumni
Lawyers from New York City
American emigrants to Israel
Israeli people of Belgian-Jewish descent
American people of Belgian-Jewish descent
People with acquired American citizenship
Naturalized citizens of Israel
Israeli psychologists
Israeli women psychologists
20th-century Israeli women
21st-century Israeli women
BBC 100 Women
Jewish American social scientists
20th-century American women lawyers
21st-century American women lawyers
American women academics
21st-century American Jews
University of Chicago alumni